Bobby Murphy  is an American soccer coach who is currently the head coach for MLS Next Pro side St. Louis City 2 .

Coaching career
Murphy was the director of the soccer academy at St. Stephen's Episcopal School from 2003 to 2016. Before this, he was the director of coaching for the South Texas Youth Soccer Association.

Orlando City
On January 15, 2016, Murphy joined Orlando City SC of Major League Soccer as an assistant coach. Almost seven months later, on July 7, Murphy was named the interim head coach of Orlando City after Adrian Heath was relieved of his duties. His first match as interim head coach occurred on July 8 against the Houston Dynamo. The match ended 0–0. Following the hiring of Jason Kreis, Murphy resumed his role as assistant coach and technical coordinator of the club's U.S. Soccer development academy. After Kreis was relieved of his duties in 2018, Murphy once again served as interim head coach until James O'Connor was hired, who did not retain Murphy.

Union Omaha
In March 2021, Murphy joined USL League One side Union Omaha as an assistant coach.

St. Louis City SC 2
On January 23, 2023, Murphy was named head coach for St. Louis City SC 2 in MLS Next Pro.

Statistics

Coaching statistics

References

Living people
American soccer coaches
Orlando City SC coaches
Major League Soccer coaches
Place of birth missing (living people)
Year of birth missing (living people)
Orlando City SC non-playing staff
Union Omaha
USL League One coaches
Rio Grande Valley FC Toros coaches
USL Championship coaches
St. Louis City SC